Broomfield Junior Soccer Club (BJSC), commonly known as Broomfield Soccer Club (BSC), is a youth association football (aka soccer) club based in Broomfield, Colorado, USA.

Club structure 
BSC is an independent, volunteer run, 501(c)(3) non-profit corporation which provides recreational and competitive soccer programs for the boys and girls of Broomfield as well as those of surrounding communities. The Club provides for the administration of the programs as well as the recruitment of coaches, referees, and players. Most of BSC's activities are managed by paid staff with strategic oversight provided by a Board of Directors elected from the Club's membership.

BSC is affiliated with Colorado Soccer Association (CSA), which is affiliated with the United States Youth Soccer Association (USYSA) which is the youth affiliate and largest member of U.S. Soccer, the governing body for soccer in the United States.  In turn, US Soccer is affiliated with the Federal International Football Association (FIFA), the international governing body for soccer.

Operationally, BSC is divided into two components:
 Recreational: BSC operates a fall and spring season each year for youth ages 3–14. The program is divided into single year age groups by gender (e.g. U8 Girls, U8 Boys, etc.). At the younger age groups the emphasis is on learning technique, fundamentals of soccer tactics and sportsmanship. Teams compete in age-specific intra-club leagues through U8, then have the option of playing in a CSA administered north Denver metro league or higher level CSA administered U9 and U10 "Intermediate" recreational leagues. Game results and league tables are not kept. After U10, the Recreational leagues are consolidated as there are far fewer teams since most players make the transition at U11 into Competitive soccer.
 Competitive: Broomfield Blast Soccer Club (BBSC) is part of the BSC and provides the opportunity for Competitive soccer play for advanced players age 10 and up. The teams compete in various Advanced State League divisions in CSA with Challenge divisions at the bottom, then Classic and finally Premier / Super League divisions at the top of the league structure (similar to how professional league tiers are arranged in much of the world). Game results and league tables are maintained and there is an annual promotion / relegation scheme in place to balance the level of competition in each division.

Part of BSC's success is due to the numerous volunteers who give their time to help Broomfield youth learn to play the world's favorite past time. Many of the Club's volunteers are parents who start with little or no soccer experience and progress with their children to become both knowledgeable and enthusiastic about the game.

Club Motto 
In March 2010, the Club officially adopted the following motto:
 Honor the Game. Believe in Yourself. Play with Passion. Achieve your Dreams.

This motto reflects the Club's commitment to fair play, enjoyment of the game and dual development of players’ soccer and life skills.

History

Early years: 1974-2006 
Formed in August 1974, BSC is one of Colorado's oldest soccer clubs with only a handful of clubs such as Denver Kickers (est 1962) and Skyline Soccer Association (est 1967) having a longer history. The Club's original membership that first season included less than 20 players.

After almost 12 years of operation, the Club incorporated as a Colorado non-profit in June 1986.

Modern era: 2007-Present 
For several years after reorganizing as a non-profit, the Recreational and Competitive programs were operated completely independent of one another including separate boards.  As part of a strategy developed in December 2007, the Club embarked upon a process to re-unify the boards and more tightly couple the programs. In September 2009, revised by-laws were put into effect which formally re-unified the Club under a single nine member Board of Directors. For Club membership, this was a big step forward because it simplified the operating structure and meant younger players (and their coaches) in the Recreational program would have greater access to the player development expertise of the Competitive program.

Additionally, the reunification set in motion three key changes. The first was the hiring of the Club's first Executive Director (ED), Michael King, in Oct 2010. A paid position, the Executive Director was charged with all aspects of running both the Recreational and Competitive sides of the Club. Previously, the Recreational portion of the Club had largely been operated by volunteers with part-time employees supporting certain activities. Given that by 2008 the Recreational area had grown to 1,500+ players, the addition of an ED was long over due. The second change was a direct outcome of the first. With an Executive Director in place, the Club's Board began to transition to a higher level, more strategic type of organization looking to the future of the Club including assessing and assembling plans to remain competitive and relevant in Denver metro soccer scene.

The final key change was the hiring of a new Director of Coaching (DoC), Tim Hankinson in 2010 to mentor and develop not only Competitive coaches (which had been the remit of prior DoCs), but Recreational coaches as well. A former head coach for MLS’s Colorado Rapids, Hankinson's international background working with professional and collegiate players brought a great deal of expertise and positive exposure to the Club.

Hankinson was not the first person formerly associated with the Colorado Rapids to hold the DoC post.  For a brief time in 2004, former US MNT player Marcelo Balboa was the Club's DoC, but soon departed to return to the Rapids for a front office post. Coincidentally, Hankinson and Balboa also had a history.  Their paths crossed for one season in 2001, Hankinson's first year with the Rapids and Balboa's last. In Jan 2002 Balboa was traded by the Rapids to the NY / NJ MetroStars (now known as the New York Red Bulls) while Hankinson continued on with the Rapids for three additional seasons.

Following a productive year with Broomfield SC, Hankinson received an offer he could not refuse.  On 14 Sep 2011, Hankinson was announced as the first head coach for San Antonio Scorpions FC of the North American Soccer League (NASL). After a deliberate search, a new DoC was appointed by the Club and on 09 Nov 2011, Liam Sinclair took the reins as DoC.  A lifelong player, Sinclair grew up near Milton Keynes, UK and learned the game within the English youth system in the academies of professional clubs Derby County F.C. and Luton Town F.C. while also playing for county and regional select squads.  With a remit similar to the prior DoC's, Sinclair's tasks included not only coach development, but future maturation of the Club's player development philosophy and system.  Additional coaching expertise was soon added with Kevin Comer joining the Club on 01 Mar 2012 as Academy Director and David Castro quickly following on 30 Mar 2012 as Assistant DoC.

As the Club continued to change and expand, so did its staff with Mike King stepping down on 30 Jan 2013 following two years at the helm.  After a successful search process, Sandie Hammerly was appointed the Club's 2nd Executive Director on 1 Apr 2013 bringing to the Club extensive non-profit sports experience (including posts with USA Ultimate and USA Field Hockey).  After 15 months with the organization, Ms. Hammerly departed on 31 May 2015 with Jon Pasquini briefly holding the post from 6 Oct 2014 to 20 Feb 2015.  Longtime Broomfield SC coach and Broomfield Shootout tournament director Mike Schrad stepped in as the Interim Executive Director with that post becoming a permanent assignment on 1 Sep 2015.

Club leadership 
As part of becoming a nonprofit, the Club designed and elected a Board of Directors led by the president.  The following table lists the Club's current and past presidents.

State Cup & Presidents Cup

2010-11 
 Presidents Cup Champions: U16B '95 Red

2012-13 
 Presidents Cup Finalists: U13G '00 Red

2013-14 
 Presidents Cup Champions: U11G '03 Red, U14G '00 Red
 State Cup Finalists: U12B '02 Red, U18G '96 Red

2014-15 
 Presidents Cup Finalists: U15G '00 Red
 Presidents Cup Champions: U12B '03 Red, U13G '02 Red
 State Cup Champions: U14G '01 Red, U17G '98 Red

2015-16 
 Presidents Cup Finalists: U16G '00 Prestige (fka Red)
 State Cup Champions: U15G '01 Prestige (fka Red), U18G '98 Prestige (fka Red)

2016-17 
 Presidents Cup Champions: U16G '01 Magista (fka White)
 State Cup Champions: U16G '01 Prestige (fka Red)

2017-18 
 Presidents Cup Finalists: U13 '05 Girls Magista, U17 '01 Girls Magista, U18 '00 Girls Magista
 State Cup Finalists: U13 '05 Girls Prestige, U18 '00 Girls Prestige, U19 '99 Girls Prestige
 State Cup Champions: U17 '01 Girls Prestige

Crest and colours 
In the spring of 2008, the Club rebranded and adopted its current shield logo for both Recreational and Competitive.  There are currently two different variations of the logo, one for the Recreational program and one for the Competitive program.

The Club's official colors are Red and Black.

Kit manufacturers

Recreational manufacturers and sponsors

Competitive manufacturers and sponsors

Other activities

Tournaments 
First held in Aug 2005, the Broomfield Shootout quickly grew to become one of the largest soccer tournaments in Colorado with 275+ teams competing each year.  The tournament is primarily aimed at older, Competitive teams, but also offers divisions for U9 and U10 Recreational teams. For the 2010 tournament, the organizers adopted a number of environmentally responsible practices such as trash recycling and tournament gifts and merchandise made from recycled materials. Subsequently, tournament themes included nods to UEFA Euro 2012 for the Shootout's 2012 tournament and to the emerging street soccer trend for 2013.

Beyond the Broomfield Shootout, in 2012 the Club also launched the Winter Indoor Classic indoor tournament in collaboration with Colorado Edge SC. Run annually during the Christmas holiday season, the event offers divisions for U10 to high school age players. The event was discontinued following the 2013 edition.

Five-a-side League 
First held during the summer of 2009, the Broomfield Five-a-side League was one of the first of its kind in Colorado. The Club's Five-a-side league originally included not only youth divisions (starting at U9), but adult divisions as well. For 2012, the program's design was altered to provide a short league season capped off by a tournament. As part of the changes, referees were eliminated for the league (but retained for the tournament) to encourage players to behave as they might in a "pick-up" environment (call your own fouls). The adult divisions were also scrapped to fully focus on delivering the youth portion of the program.

Camps 
First held in July 2010, the International Soccer Camp (ISC) aims to introduce players U11 and older to training techniques from other countries and includes international coaches. For 2012, the ISC camp was rebranded as the Pro League Camp (PLC). Additionally, starting in 2012 BSC began offering a second camp aimed at U9-U10 players called the Academy All Star Camp (AASC). In 2013, the Striker Camp was launched to focus specifically on skills important for forwards and other attacking players. In 2015, the Pro League Goalkeeper Camp was added to the roster of BSC operated summer camps.

References

External links
 Official Club Website

Soccer clubs in Colorado
Association football clubs established in 1974
Broomfield, Colorado
1974 establishments in Colorado